For 1983 in television, see:

1983 in Albanian television
1983 in American television
1983 in Australian television
1983 in Austrian television
1983 in Belgian television
1983 in Brazilian television
1983 in British television
1983 in Canadian television
1983 in Croatian television
1983 in Czech television
1983 in Danish television
1983 in French television
1983 in German television
1983 in Irish television
1983 in Israeli television
1983 in Japanese television
1983 in New Zealand television
1983 in Norwegian television
1983 in Philippine television
1983 in Portuguese television
1983 in Scottish television
1983 in Singapore television
1983 in South African television
1983 in Swedish television